Benjamin Michael John Allison (born 18 December 1999) is an English cricketer. He made his first-class debut on 18 August 2019, for Gloucestershire in the 2019 County Championship, while on loan from Essex. He made his Twenty20 debut 20 September 2020, for Essex in the 2020 t20 Blast. He made his List A debut on 29 July 2021, for Essex in the 2021 Royal London One-Day Cup.

References

External links
 

1999 births
Living people
English cricketers
Essex cricketers
Gloucestershire cricketers
Sportspeople from Colchester